The International Journal of Wireless Information Networks is a quarterly peer-reviewed scientific journal covering research on wireless networks, including sensor networks, mobile ad hoc networks, wireless personal area networks, wireless LANs, indoor positioning systems, wireless health, body area networking, cyber-physical systems, and RFID techniques. The journal is abstracted and indexed in Scopus.

References

External links
 

Wireless networking
Computer science journals
Engineering journals
Publications established in 1994
Springer Science+Business Media academic journals
Quarterly journals
English-language journals